Mason Ewing Corporation is a holding company based in Los Angeles directed by Mason Ewing, who created it in 2011. The corporation targets mainly fashion, cinema and music industry but also various other sectors such as cosmetic and chocolate.

The enterprise has various subsidiaries in several countries like Mason Ewing Corporation (Canada), Les Entreprises Ewing (France) et Ewingwood (Cameroon). The opening of the Administrative council was scheduled in 2017.

Mid July on Facebook platforms, an additional branch in China was announced by the general director for 2018.

The enterprise is known for fashion. The clothing line Mason Ewing includes a line of t-shirts with Braille and an haute couture brand, both directed towards Espoir Pour l'Avenir.

Industries

Fashion 
The house of couture Mason Ewing is a subsidiary branch belonging to Mason Ewing Corporation. It was created by Mason Ewing a few years prior to the holding opening. His godfathers are Emmanuel Petit (Soccer champion 1998) and Olivier Lapidus (son of seamstress Ted Lapidus). Lines include:

•	A t-shirt line with Braille writing for both the sighted and the non-sighted. Mason Ewing, himself blind, conceived of these to enable wearers to be aware of their colours, to be able to dress without assistance. He created Braille clothing, T-shirt, polos, etc... On the shirts in this line, baby Madison is shown engaging in different activities (on a skateboard, on a BMX, with a guitar). Braille is appended on clothing describing the baby's activity. 5% of all proceeds are given to the Sos Madison International association.

•	A line of haute couture created by Ewing to honour his mother Marie, herself a seamstress, stylist and model artist. The Espoir Pour l'Avenir collection was appeared on runways in France (Eurosites on Georges V), Canada (hotel Hilton de Gatineau), Cameroon (hotel Hilton of Yaounde), Saint Martin (election of Miss Caribbean), and Martinique.

•	And underwear collection for women, Elisa Charnel (featured simultaneously with Espoir Pour l'Avenir).

Audiviosual 
The footage Descry boosted the audiovisual aspect. Since then, this pole has created animation movies such as Les Aventures de Madison, starring baby Madison and his friend Johan. Followed by the adventures of Pilou et Michou, a TV show designed for kids telling the story of the common file of men in the 18th century. Pilou is a mindless 17-year-old young man living with his mom Cunégonde as well as his grandmother Michou.

Aside from the animations targeted for kids, Mason Ewing Corporation produces TV series for teenagers. They also carry out messages like family, societal taboos and empowerment. And soon, Mickey Boom is a TV show produced by the subsidiary French, undertaking Eryna Bella produced in Los Angeles and Two Plus Three, both produced in the same country. The same message is conveyed for adults but with more brooding feelings like in the film. Angels of the World that will be filmed in the United States.

Loyal to his background, Mason Ewing produced a movie called Orishas, The Hidden Pantheon directed Yann Loïc Kieffoloh, speaking about esoteric mythology in western countries : African mythology. This long footage should be in theatres by 2017.

Mason Ewing always emphasized on promising films. In order to convey and transmit messages, humour is often used as a softer alternative. Not every film had a sole vocation of sending messages.

During 2017 Mason Ewing Corporation will produce the first part of its trilogy combining horror and fiction Elie Grimm, The Cursed Child, which be filmed in 2017.

Literature 
In 2016, Mason Ewing Corporation Canada teams up with Lecompte-Jeunesse publishing together audio and written tales for children to publish tales (paper and audio) for children.

Multimedia 
Subsequently, the literary pole will be publishing starting January 2017 a magazine called Kimy Gloss. This review will be going about current events regarding celebrities, cosmetics and actor/model castings.

Filmography 

 2011 : Descry
 2016 : Orishas : The Hidden Pantheon
 2017 : Névroses
 2017 : Comme Les Autres

Yet to come

Audiovisual 
 2020 : Une Lueur d'Espoir
 2020 : Mickey Boom
 2020 : Love in Yaounde
 2021 : Elie Grimm : The Cursed Child

References

External links 
 Mason Ewing Corp. on IMDb

Film production companies of the United States
Holding companies of the United States
Clothing companies of the United States
Entertainment companies based in California
Companies based in Los Angeles County, California
Entertainment companies established in 2011
Braille
American companies established in 2011
Clothing companies established in 2011
Holding companies established in 2011